Hereditary angioedema (HAE) is a disorder that results in recurrent attacks of severe swelling. The swelling most commonly affects the arms, legs, face, intestinal tract, and airway. If the intestinal tract is affected, abdominal pain and vomiting may occur. Swelling of the airway can result in its obstruction and trouble breathing. Without preventive treatment, attacks typically occur every two weeks and last for a few days.

There are three main types of HAE. Types I and II are caused by a mutation in the SERPING1 gene, which makes the C1 inhibitor protein, while type III is often due to a mutation in the F12 (factor XII) gene. The result is increased levels of bradykinin, which promotes swelling. The condition may be inherited in an autosomal dominant manner or occur as a new mutation. Triggers for an attack may include minor trauma or stress, but attacks often occur without any obvious preceding event. Diagnosis of types I and II is based on measurement of C4 and C1-inhibitor levels.

Management of HAE involves efforts to prevent attacks and the treatment of attacks if they occur. During an attack, supportive care such as intravenous fluids and airway support may be required. C1 inhibitor medications can be used for both prevention and treatment, while ecallantide and icatibant can be used to treat acute attacks.

HAE affects approximately 1 in 50,000 people. The condition is typically first noticed in childhood. Type I and II affected females and males equally, while type III affects females more often than males. When the airway is involved, without treatment, the risk of death is about 25%. With treatment, outcomes are generally good. The condition was first described in 1888 by Canadian physician William Osler.

Signs and symptoms
People diagnosed with Hereditary Angioedema have recurrent swelling in the extremities, genitals, face, lips, larynx or GI tract. Some patients describe a sensation of fullness but not pain or itching in the affected area except for those with abdominal swellings who often experience acute abdominal pain. Others experience an intense amount of pain, described as radiating from the bone outward along with intense itching just beneath the skin and intense heat, regardless of the area targeted.

Swelling involving the respiratory and gastrointestinal systems can cause significant risk and distress. Involvement of respiratory structures, such as the throat or larynx, can cause difficulties in breathing and life-threatening airway obstruction. Episodes that attack the gastrointestinal tract can cause a number of complications including vomiting, crampy abdominal pain, diarrhea, and dehydration.

Some people with HAE experience 'wandering' attacks. These attacks will center around an extremity. For example: Should the affected person's hand swell up, it will go through the normal swelling cycle before 'transferring' to either the connection limb (In this case wrist to forearm) or move to the opposite hand. People with this symptom may find their episodes last longer and may find their triggers more difficult to track.

Genetics 
Because HAE is an autosomal dominant disease, there is no sex difference in transmission and both sexes are equally likely to receive the mutated gene from their parents. In an example, a father (individual A) with a mutated gene for HAE, has the disease while his wife (individual B) with 2 non-mutated copies of the C1 inhibitor gene and does not have the disease. The possibility of a cross between them gives the possibilities as shown: two of their offspring will have the disease (HAE) while the others would not.

The affected father who has HAE has a mutation on one of his genes (C1-INH). Each one of his children, regardless of sex, will have a 50% chance to inherit the mutated C1-INH gene from him. HAE is generally referred to as a "dominant" condition because it only takes a mutation in one of the two C1-INH genes in a carrier to cause the disease.

The prevalence of HAE is relatively low – between 1 in every 10,000 to 1 in every 50,000 persons. Most persons with HAE acquire a C1 esterase inhibitor (C1-INH) mutation from one of their parents. A parent with HAE usually has a 50% probability of transmitting this condition on to one of his/her children of either sex as shown in the figure (HEA Inheritance). People with no previous history of can acquire HAE by spontaneous changes in the sperm or egg cell. In a review of patients who do not have a history of HAE in their family, but who have relatively low levels of mutated C1-INH with persistent angioedema, 25% of new patients who had HAE had C1-INH changes that do not show signs of inheritance.

Diagnosis

Recognizing HAE is often difficult due to the wide variability in disease expression. The course of the disease is diverse and unpredictable, even within a single patient over their lifetime. This disease may be similar in its presentation to other forms of angioedema resulting from allergies or other medical conditions, but it is significantly different in cause and treatment. When HAE is misdiagnosed as an allergy it is most commonly treated with steroids and epinephrine, drugs that are usually ineffective in treating a HAE episode. Other misdiagnoses have resulted in unnecessary exploratory surgery for patients with abdominal swelling and other HAE patients report that their abdominal pain was wrongly diagnosed as psychosomatic.

HAE accounts for only a small fraction of all cases of angioedema. To avoid potentially fatal consequences such as upper airway obstruction and unnecessary abdominal surgery, the importance of a correct diagnosis cannot be overemphasized.

HAE should be considered if a patient presents with:
 Recurrent angioedema (without urticaria)
 Recurrent episodes of abdominal pain and vomiting
 Laryngeal edema
 Positive family history of angioedema
A blood test, ideally taken during an episode, can be used to diagnose the condition. Measure: serum complement factor 4 (C4),
C1 inhibitor (C1-INH) antigenic protein, C1 inhibitor (C1-INH) functional level if available. Analysis of complement C1 inhibitor levels may play a role in diagnosis. C4 and C2 are complementary components.

Types
There are three types of C1 inhibitor deficiency:

HAE type I is primarily caused by a deficiency in blood proteins (C1 esterase inhibitors) which normally suppress activation of the complement system. The resultant overstimulation of this system leads to the production of inflammatory anaphylatoxins, which affects the flow of body fluids between the vascular system and body tissues. This deficiency is responsible for approximately 80–85% of cases.

HAE type II is a less frequently encountered form of this disorder and accounts for 15–20% of cases. In this type, atypical C1-inhibitor proteins are produced which are less capable of suppressing activation of the complement system. Like HAE type I, this results in overstimulation of this system.

HAE type III is rare and has only been documented recently. Unlike types I and II, this form does not appear to be connected with C1-inhibitor deficiency. This type mainly affects females and appears to be influenced by contact with estrogens and also by hormone replacement therapy (e.g. oral contraceptives). Its pathogenesis is credited to increased activity of the enzyme kininogenase, which leads to rise in the levels of bradykinin. Other patients with type III HAE have alterations in gene F12, which encodes a protein which participates in blood coagulation. Some patients with type III HAE have a mutation in the F12 gene which produces a protein involved in blood clotting. Due to the results of a genetic test on 4 affected German families, it is believed that this type of the condition is caused by a disease-causing gene in chromosome 5q.35.2-q35.3.

Prevention
Treatment with ACE inhibitors is contraindicated in this condition, as these drugs can lead to bradykinin accumulation, which can precipitate disease episodes.

Long-term
People in whom episodes occur at least once a month or who are at high risk of developing laryngeal edema require long-term prevention. There are several phase III clinical trials addressing HAE prophylaxis and therapy. These have led to the licensing of pdC1INH in many parts of the world; bradykinin receptor antagonists (icatibant) in Europe; kallikrein inhibitors (ecallantide and lanadelumab) in the United States; and recombinant C1-INH replacement therapy (rhC1INH; conestat alfa) in Europe. Tranexamic acid has been shown to be relatively ineffective therapy. Danazol prophylaxis remains an option but therapeutic agents are now being used more for prophylaxis because of danazol's adverse events. For people requiring long-term prophylaxis, home therapy which allows people to self-administer the product, is considered an integral part of allowing patients a normal quality of life.

In 2018, the U.S. Food and Drug Administration (FDA) approved lanadelumab, an injectable monoclonal antibody, to prevent attacks of HAE types I and II in people over age 12. Lanadelumab inhibits the plasma enzyme kallikrein, which liberates the kinins bradykinin and kallidin from their kininogen precursors and is produced in excess in individuals with HAE types I and II.

Berotralstat was approved in the US in December 2020, for the prevention of attacks of hereditary angioedema in people over twelve years of age.

Short-term
Short-term prevention is normally administered before surgery or dental treatment. In Germany, C1-INH concentrate is used for this and given 1–1.5 hours before the procedure. In countries where C1-inhibitor concentrate is not available or only available in an emergency (laryngeal edema), high-dose androgen treatment is administered for 5–7 days.

Management
The aim of acute treatment is to halt progression of the edema as quickly as possible, which can be life-saving, particularly if the swelling is in the larynx. In Germany, most acute treatment consists of C1 inhibitor concentrate from donor blood, which must be administered intravenously; however, in most European countries, C1 inhibitor concentrate is only available to patients who are participating in special programs. In emergency situations where C1 inhibitor concentrate is not available, fresh frozen plasma (FFP) can be used as an alternative, as it also contains C1 inhibitor.

Other treatment modalities can stimulate the synthesis of C1 inhibitor, or reduce C1 inhibitor consumption. Purified C1 inhibitor, derived from human blood, has been used in Europe since 1979. Several C1 inhibitor treatments are now available in the U.S. Food and Drug Administration and two C1 inhibitor products are now available in Canada. Berinert P (CSL Behring), which is pasteurized, was approved by the F.D.A. in 2009 for acute attacks. Cinryze (ViroPharma), which is nanofiltered, was approved by the F.D.A. in 2008 for prophylaxis. Ruconest (Pharming) is a recombinant C1 inhibitor approved in the US and Europe that does not carry the risk of infectious disease transmission due to human blood-borne pathogens.

The medication ecallantide inhibits plasma kallikrein and was approved by the F.D.A. (but not in Europe) for acute attacks in 2009. Icatibant inhibits the bradykinin B2 receptor, and was approved in Europe and the USA.
In HAE, specific stimuli that have previously led to attacks may need to be avoided in the future. It does not respond to antihistamines, corticosteroids, or epinephrine.

In February 2023, the FDA approved the expanded use of lanadelumab (Takhzyro) to prevent attacks of hereditary angioedema in children aged 2 to 12 years of age.

Prognosis 
About 25% of those affected die in the first two decades of life, mainly due to lack of treatment.

Epidemiology
Data regarding the epidemiology of angioedema is limited. The incidence of HAE is one in 10,000–50,000 people in the United States and Canada. Mortality rates are estimated at 15–33%, resulting primarily from laryngeal edema and asphyxiation. HAE leads to 15,000–30,000 emergency department visits per year.

Society and culture
There are national associations for HAE patients and their families in a number of countries around the world. These national associations are members of the global organization HAEi - International Patient Organization for C1-Inhibitor Deficiencies. HAEi is dedicated to raising awareness of C1 inhibitor deficiencies around the world. It is a non-profit international network established to promote co-operation, co-ordination and information sharing between HAE specialists and national HAE patient associations in order to help facilitate the availability of effective diagnosis and management of C1 inhibitor deficiencies throughout the world.

Each year on 16 May, HAEi and the HAE community raise awareness of HAE with the international hae day :-)

The Assistance Fund Inc. is an American nonprofit organization that offers co-pay assistance for medications that treat HAE and is open to any American Citizens or landed immigrants who have insurance.

A column on puzzling medical cases in The New York Times Magazine featured a 45-year-old woman with intestinal swelling who was ultimately diagnosed as having type III HAE. The patient’s HAE attack had been triggered by exposure to estrogen from her oral contraceptive.

Research
Clinical development of several new active substances, which intervene in the disease process in different ways, is currently ongoing.

Pharming Group NV announced on 24 June 2010 that the European Medicines Agency has adopted a positive opinion on conestat alfa (trade name Ruconest), a C1-inhibitor for the treatment of acute angioedema attacks.

Ecallantide, a peptide inhibitor of kallikrein, has received orphan status for HAE and has shown positive results in phase III trials.

Icatibant (marketed as Firazyr) is a selective bradykinin receptor antagonist, which has been approved in Europe and was approved in the US by the FDA in Aug 2011. After initial borderline results this drug was shown to be effective in phase III trials. Cinryze has been approved by the FDA in October 2008.

References

Further reading

External links 

 

Urticaria and angioedema
Serpinopathies
Complement deficiency
Wikipedia medicine articles ready to translate
Wikipedia emergency medicine articles ready to translate